Stechford and Yardley North is one of the 40 electoral wards in Birmingham, England.

Stechford and Yardley North is one of the four wards that make up the council constituency of Yardley. It covers an area of 4.4 square kilometres.

East Yardley, part of Garretts Green, Glebe Farm, Old Yardley Village, Poolway, Stechford including Stechford Village and Whittington Oval Estate are areas all covered by the ward.

Population
According to the 2001 Population Census there were 22,976 people living in 10,001 households in Stechford and Yardley North with a population density of 5,170 people per km2 compared with 3,649 people per km2 for Birmingham. 15.1% (3,458) of the ward's population consists of ethnic minorities compared with 29.6% for Birmingham in general. The population of the ward as taken at the 2011 census had increased to 25,757.

Politics
As of 2005, the three councillors representing Stechford and Yardley North on Birmingham City Council are Neil Eustace, Barbara Jackson and Carol Jones, all of the Liberal Democrat Party.

The ward has adopted a Ward Support Officer, with the current holder of the title being Osaf Ahmed.

Places of interest
The ward is served by two libraries; Kents Moat and Glebe Farm libraries. There are numerous areas of open space and recreation grounds.

There is one secondary school, one nursery school and five primary schools located in Stechford and Yardley North.

Stechford railway station and Lea Hall railway station both serve the ward.

Sport
Stechford Cascades is a swimming facility in Stechford with an adjacent gym. Sheldon Marlborough Cricket Club, a privately managed cricket club, is located within the boundaries. Sedgmere Sports and Social Club and Co-op Sports and Social Club, two privately managed sports and social clubs are located within the boundaries.

Stechford Football Club was created through funding from the Neighbourhood Renewal Fund.

Ward Description
The ward covers an area of {} Birmingham, including the districts of {}.

Ward Demographics (from the census of 2001)

Ward history
The ward was created in {}, with the boundaries being unaltered until {}.

Parliamentary Representation
The ward has been part of Birmingham {} constituency.

Politics

Election results

2000s

1990s

1980s

1970s

1960s

1950s

1940s

References

External links
Birmingham City Council's pages on Stechford and Yardley North Ward
Stechford Football Club
Stechford and Yardley North census information

Former wards of Birmingham, West Midlands